The list of poems by Philip Larkin come mostly from the four volumes of poetry published during his lifetime:

The North Ship (July 1945)
The Less Deceived (November 1955, dated October)
The Whitsun Weddings (February 1964)
High Windows (June 1974)

Philip Larkin (1922–1985) also published other poems. They, along with the contents of the four published collections, are included in the 2003 edition of his Collected Poems in two appendices. The previous 1988 edition contains everything that appears in the 2003 edition and additionally includes all the known mature poems that he did not publish during his lifetime, plus an appendix of early work. To help differentiate between these published and unpublished poems in our table all poems that appear in the 2003 edition's appendices are listed as Collected Poems 2003; of course, they also appear in the 1988 volume.

Since 1988 many other unpublished, and as yet uncollected, poems have come to light. Some of these poems have now been included in "The Complete Poems by Philip Larkin," edited by Archie Burnett.

List of poems

The following is the list of 244 poems attributed to Philip Larkin.  Untitled poems are identified by their first lines and marked with an ellipsis. Completion dates are in the YYYY-MM-DD format, and are tagged "(best known date)" if the date is not definitive.

{|class="wikitable sortable"
!Poem title!!Completion date!!Book
|-
|Absences||1950-11-28||The Less Deceived
|-
|Administration||1965-03-03||Collected Poems 1988
|-
|After-Dinner Remarks||1940-06 (best known date)||Collected Poems 1988
|-
|Afternoons||1959-09 (best known date)||The Whitsun Weddings
|-
|Age||1954-05-26||The Less Deceived
|-
|All catches alight... (to Bruce Montgomery)||1944 (best known date)||The North Ship
|-
|Ambulances||1961-01-10||The Whitsun Weddings
|-
|An April Sunday brings the snow...||1948-04-04||Collected Poems 1988
|-
|An Arundel Tomb||1956-02-20||The Whitsun Weddings
|-
|And now the leaves suddenly lose strength...||1961-11-03||Collected Poems 1988
|-
|And the wave sings because it is moving...||1946-09-14||Collected Poems 1988
|-
|Annus Mirabilis||1967-06-16||High Windows
|-
|Ape Experiment Room||1965-02-24||Collected Poems 1988
|-
|Arrival||1950 (best known date)||Collected Poems 2003
|-
|Arrivals, Departures||1953-01-24||The Less Deceived
|-
|As a war in years of peace...||1940 (best known date)||Collected Poems 1988
|-
|As Bad as a Mile||1960-02-09||The Whitsun Weddings
|-
|At Grass||1950-01-03||The Less Deceived
|-
|At the chiming of light upon sleep...||1946-10-04||Collected Poems 1988
|-
|At thirty-one, when some are rich... (unfinished)||1953-08 (best known date)||Collected Poems 1988
|-
|Aubade||1977-11-29||Collected Poems 1988
|-
|Autobiography at an Air-Station||1953-12-06||Collected Poems 1988
|-
|Autumn||1953-10 (best known date)||Collected Poems 1988
|-
|Autumn has caught us in our summer wear...||1939 (best known date)||Collected Poems 1988
|-
|Best Society||1951 (best known date)||Collected Poems 1988
|-
|Born Yesterday (for Sally Amis)||1954-01-20||The Less Deceived
|-
|The bottle is drunk out by one...||1944 (best known date)||The North Ship
|-
|Breadfruit||1961-11-19||Collected Poems 2003
|-
|Bridge for the Living||1975–12 (best known date)||Collected Poems 2003
|-
|Broadcast||1961-11-06||The Whitsun Weddings
|-
|The Building||1972-02-09||High Windows
|-
|By day, a lifted study-storehouse...||1983-10 (best known date)||Collected Poems 1988
|-
|The Card-Players||1970-05-06||High Windows
|-
|Church Going||1954-07-28||The Less Deceived
|-
|Climbing the hill within the deafening wind...||1944-10-23||The North Ship
|-
|Come then to prayers...||1946-05-13||Collected Poems 1988
|-
|Coming||1950-02-25||The Less Deceived
|-
|Coming at last to night's most thankful springs...||1945-03-01||Collected Poems 1988
|-
|Compline||1950-02-12||Collected Poems 1988
|-
|Conscript (for James Ballard Sutton)||1941-10 (best known date)||The North Ship
|-
|Continuing to Live||1954-04-24||Collected Poems 2003
|-
|Counting||1955–09 (best known date)||Collected Poems 1988
|-
|Cut Grass||1971-06-03||High Windows
|-
|The daily things we do...||1979-02 (best known date)||Collected Poems 1988
|-
|The Dance (unfinished)||1964-05-12||Collected Poems 1988
|-
|The Dancer||1944 (best known date)||The North Ship
|-
|Dawn||1944 (best known date)||The North Ship
|-
|Days||1953-08-03||The Whitsun Weddings
|-
|Dear Charles, My Muse, asleep or dead...||1982 (best known date)||Collected Poems 2003
|-
|Deceptions||1950-02-20||The Less Deceived
|-
|The Dedicated||1946-09-18||Collected Poems 2003
|-
|Deep Analysis||1946-04 (best known date)||Collected Poems 1988
|-
|Disintegration||1942-02 (best known date)||Collected Poems 2003
|-
|Dockery and Son||1963-03-28||The Whitsun Weddings
|-
|Dry–Point||1950-03-17||The Less Deceived
|-
|Dublinesque||1970-06-06||High Windows
|-
|Essential Beauty||1962-06-26||The Whitsun Weddings
|-
|The Explosion||1970-01-05||High Windows
|-
|Faith Healing||1960-05-10||The Whitsun Weddings
|-
|Far Out||1959-02-01||Collected Poems 1988
|-
|Femmes Damnées||1943 (best known date)||Collected Poems 2003
|-
|Fiction and the Reading Public||1950-02-25||Collected Poems 2003
|-
|First Sight||1956-03-03||The Whitsun Weddings
|-
|For Sidney Bechet||1954-01-15||The Whitsun Weddings
|-
|Forget What Did||1971-08-06||High Windows
|-
|Fragment from May||1938 (best known date)||Collected Poems 1988
|-
|Friday Night in the Royal Station Hotel||1966-05-20||High Windows
|-
|Gathering Wood||1954-03-25||Collected Poems 1988
|-
|Going||1946–02 (best known date)||The Less Deceived
|-
|Going, Going||1972-01-25||High Windows
|-
|Good for you, Gavin...||1981-11-26||Collected Poems 1988
|-
|Having grown up in shade of Church and State...||1939-06 (best known date)||Collected Poems 1988
|-
|He Hears that his Beloved has become Engaged (for C.G.B.)||1953-01-29||Collected Poems 1988|-
|Heads in the Women's Ward||1972-03-06||Collected Poems 2003|-
|Heaviest of flowers, the head...||1944 (best known date)||The North Ship|-
|Here||1961-10-08||The Whitsun Weddings|-
|High Windows||1967-02-12||High Windows|-
|The hills in their recumbent postures...||1940-03 (best known date)||Collected Poems 1988|-
|Homage to a Government||1969-01-10||High Windows|-
|Home is so Sad||1958-12-31||The Whitsun Weddings|-
|The horns of the morning...||1944 (best known date)||The North Ship|-
|Hospital Visits||1953-12-04||Collected Poems 1988|-
|The house on the edge of the serious wood...||1941-04 (best known date)||Collected Poems 1988|-
|How||1970-04-10||Collected Poems 2003|-
|How Distant||1965-11-24||High Windows|-
|How to Sleep||1950-03-10||Collected Poems 1988|-
|I am washed upon a rock...||1949-03-19||Collected Poems 1988|-
|I dreamed of an out-thrust arm of land||1943 (best known date)||The North Ship|-
|I have started to say...||1971-10 (best known date)||Collected Poems 1988|-
|I put my mouth...||1944 (best known date)||The North Ship|-
|I Remember, I Remember||1954-01-08||The Less Deceived|-
|If grief could burn out...||1944-10-05||The North Ship|-
|I see a girl dragged by the wrists...||1944 (best known date)||The North Ship|-
|If hands could free you, heart...||1944 (best known date)||The North Ship|-
|If, My Darling||1950-05-23||The Less Deceived|-
|Ignorance||1955-09-11||The Whitsun Weddings|-
|In times when nothing stood...||1978-03-02||Collected Poems 2003|-
|The Importance of Elsewhere||1955-06-13||The Whitsun Weddings|-
|Is it for now or for always...||1944 (best known date)||The North Ship|-
|Kick up the fire, and let the flames break loose...||1944 (best known date)||The North Ship|-
|The Large Cool Store||1961-06-18||The Whitsun Weddings|-
|Last Will and Testament||1940-09 (best known date)||Collected Poems 1988|-
|Latest Face||1951-02 (best known date)||The Less Deceived|-
|Letter to a Friend about Girls||1959-12 (best known date)||Collected Poems 1988|-
|The Life with a Hole in it||1974-08-08||Collected Poems 2003|-
|Lift through the breaking day...||1945-08-27||Collected Poems 1988|-
|Like the train's beat...||1944 (best known date)||The North Ship|-
|Lines on a Young Lady's Photograph Album||1953-09-18||The Less Deceived|-
|The Literary World||1950-03-20||Collected Poems 1988|-
|The little lives of earth and form...||1977-05-06||Collected Poems 1988|-
|Livings: I, II, III||1971-12-10||High Windows|-
|Long Last||1963-02-03||Collected Poems 1988|-
|Long lion days...||1982-07-21||Collected Poems 1988|-
|Long roots moor summer to our side of earth...||1954-06-12||Collected Poems 1988|-
|Long Sight in Age||1955-06-20||Collected Poems 1988|-
|Love||1962-12-07||Collected Poems 2003|-
|Love Again||1979-09-20||Collected Poems 1988|-
|Love Songs in Age||1957-01-01||The Whitsun Weddings|-
|Love, we must part now...||1944 (best known date)||The North Ship|-
|MCMXIV||1960-05-17||The Whitsun Weddings|-
|Maiden Name||1955-01-15||The Less Deceived|-
|Many famous feet have trod...||1946-10-15||Collected Poems 1988|-
|The March Past||1951-05-25||Collected Poems 1988|-
|Marriages||1951-06-12||Collected Poems 1988|-
|Maturity||1951 (best known date)||Collected Poems 1988|-
|May Weather||1941-06-05||Collected Poems 2003|-
|Midsummer Night, 1940||1940-06 (best known date)||Collected Poems 1988|-
|Midwinter Waking||195401-27||Collected Poems 1988|-
|Modesties||1949-05-13||Collected Poems 2003|-
|Money||1973-02-19||High Windows|-
|The moon is full tonight...||1944 (best known date)||The North Ship|-
|Morning at last: there in the snow...||1976-02-01||Collected Poems 1988|-
|Morning has spread again...||1944 (best known date)||The North Ship|-
|Mother, Summer, I||1953-08 (best known date)||Collected Poems 1988|-
|The Mower||1979-06-12||Collected Poems 2003|-
|Mr Bleaney||1955-05 (best known date)||The Whitsun Weddings|-
|Mythological Introduction||1943 (best known date)||Collected Poems 2003|-
|Myxomatosis||1954 (best known date)||The Less Deceived|-
|Naturally the Foundation will Bear Your Expenses||1961-02-22||The Whitsun Weddings|-
|Negative Indicative (unfinished)||1953-12-28||Collected Poems 1988|-
|Neurotics||1949-03 (best known date)||Collected Poems 1988|-
|New eyes each year...||1979-02 (best known date)||Collected Poems 1988|-
|New Year Poem||1940-12-31||Collected Poems 1988|-
|Next, Please||1951-01-16||The Less Deceived|-
|Night-Music||1944-10-12||The North Ship|-
|No Road||1950-10-28||The Less Deceived|-
|None of the books have time...||1960-01-01||Collected Poems 1988|-
|The North Ship||1944-10-08||The North Ship|-
|Nothing significant was really said...||1940-03 (best known date)||Collected Poems 1988|-
|Nothing To Be Said||1961-10-18||The Whitsun Weddings|-
|Nursery Tale||1944 (best known date)||The North Ship|-
|Observation||1941-11-22||Collected Poems 2003|-
|Oils||1950-03-14||Collected Poems 2003|-
|The Old Fools||1973-01-12||High Windows|-
|On Being Twenty-Six||1949-05 (best known date)||Collected Poems 1988|-
|One man walking a deserted platform...||1944 (best known date)||The North Ship|-
|Out in the lane I pause...||1940-12 (best known date)||Collected Poems 1988|-
|Party Politics||1984-01 (best known date)||Collected Poems 2003|-
|Past days of gales...||1945-11-17||Collected Poems 1988|-
|Pigeons||1955-12-27||Collected Poems 2003|-
|Places, Loved Ones||1954-10-10||The Less Deceived|-
|Plymouth||1945-06-25||Collected Poems 2003|-
|Poem about Oxford (for Monica)||1970 (best known date)||Collected Poems 1988|-
|Poetry of Departures||1954-01-23||The Less Deceived|-
|Portrait||1945-11-07||Collected Poems 2003|-
|Posterity||1968-06-17||High Windows|-
|Pour away that youth...||1944 (best known date)||The North Ship|-
|Reasons for Attendance||1953-12-30||The Less Deceived|-
|Reference Back||1955-08-21||The Whitsun Weddings|-
|Sad Steps||1968-04-24||High Windows|-
|The School in August||1943 (best known date)||Collected Poems 1988|-
|Schoolmaster||1940 (best known date)||Collected Poems 1988|-
|Scratch on the scratchpad...||1966-07-19||Collected Poems 1988|-
|Self's the Man||1958-05-05||The Whitsun Weddings|-
|Send No Money||1962-08-21||The Whitsun Weddings|-
|Show Saturday||1973-12-03||High Windows|-
|Since the majority of me...||1950-12-06||Collected Poems 2003|-
|Sinking like sediment through the day...||1949-05-13||Collected Poems 1988|-
|Skin||1954-04-05||The Less Deceived|-
|A slight relax of air where cold was...||1962-01-13||Collected Poems 1988|-
|So through that unripe day you bore your head...||1944 (best known date)||The North Ship|-
|So you have been, despite parental ban...||1940-03 (best known date)||Collected Poems 1988|-
|Solar||1964-11-04||High Windows|-
|The Spirit Wooed||1950 (best known date)||Collected Poems 1988|-
|Spring||1950-05-19||The Less Deceived|-
|Spring Warning||1940–04 (best known date)||Collected Poems 1988|-
|A Stone Church Damaged by a Bomb||1943-06 (best known date)||Collected Poems 2003|-
|Story||1941-02-13||Collected Poems 2003|-
|Strangers||1950-05-20||Collected Poems 1988|-
|Street Lamps||1939-09 (best known date)||Collected Poems 1988|-
|A Study of Reading Habits||1960-08-20||The Whitsun Weddings|-
|Success Story||1954-03-11||Collected Poems 2003|-
|Summer Nocturne||1939 (best known date)||Collected Poems 1988|-
|Sunny Prestatyn||1962-10 (best known date)||The Whitsun Weddings|-
|Sympathy in White Major||1967-08-31||High Windows|-
|Take One Home for the Kiddies||1960-08-13||The Whitsun Weddings|-
|Talking in Bed||1960-08-10||The Whitsun Weddings|-
|Thaw||1946-12  (best known date)||Collected Poems 1988|-
|The local snivels through the fields...||1951 (best known date)||Collected Poems 1988|-
|There is no language of destruction...||1940 (best known date)||Collected Poems 1988|-
|This Be The Verse||1971-04 (best known date)||High Windows|-
|This is the first thing...||1944 (best known date)||The North Ship|-
|This was your place of birth, this daytime palace...||1942-02-28||The North Ship|-
|Time and Space were only their disguises...||1941-04 (best known date)||Collected Poems 1988|-
|To a Very Slow Air||1946-09-29||Collected Poems 1988|-
|To Failure||1949-05-18||Collected Poems 1988|-
|To My Wife||1951-03-19||Collected Poems 1988|-
|To put one brick upon another...||1951 (best known date)||Collected Poems 1988|-
|To the Sea||1969-10 (best known date)||High Windows|-
|To write one song, I said...||1944 (best known date)||The North Ship|-
|Toads||1954-03-16||The Less Deceived|-
|Toads Revisited||1962-10 (best known date)||The Whitsun Weddings|-
|Tops||1953-10-24||Collected Poems 2003|-
|Träumerei||1946-09-27||Collected Poems 1988|-
|The Trees||1967-06-02||High Windows|-
|Triple Time||1953-10-03||The Less Deceived|-
|Two Guitar Pieces||1946-09-18||Collected Poems 1988|-
|Ugly Sister||1944 (best known date)||The North Ship|-
|Under a splendid chestnut tree...||1950-06 (best known date)||Collected Poems 1988|-
|Ultimatum||1940-06 (best known date)||Collected Poems 2003|-
|Unfinished Poem||1951 (best known date)||Collected Poems 1988|-
|Vers de Société||1971-05-19||High Windows|-
|The View||1972-08 (best known date)||Collected Poems 1988|-
|Waiting for breakfast, while she brushed her hair...||1947-12-15||The North Ship|-
|Wants||1950-06-01||The Less Deceived|-
|Water||1954-04-06||The Whitsun Weddings|-
|We met at the end of the party...||1976-02 (best known date)||Uncollected
|-
|We see the spring breaking across rough stone...||1939 (best known date)||Collected Poems 1988|-
|Wedding-Wind||1946-09-26||The Less Deceived|-
|Whatever Happened||1953-10-26||The Less Deceived|-
|Who whistled for the wind, that it should break...||1945-12-15||Collected Poems 1988|-
|Why did I dream of you last night?...||1939 (best known date)||Collected Poems 1988|-
|When first we touched, and touching showed...||1975-12-20||Collected Poems 1988|-
|When the night puts twenty veils...||1939-09 (best known date)||Collected Poems 1988|-
|When the Russian tanks roll westward...||1969-03 (best known date)||Collected Poems 2003|-
|The Whitsun Weddings||1958-10-18||The Whitsun Weddings|-
|Who called love conquering...||1950-07-17||Collected Poems 2003|-
|Wild Oats||1962-05-12||The Whitsun Weddings|-
|Winter||1944 (best known date)||The North Ship|-
|Winter Nocturne||1938 (best known date)||Collected Poems 1988|-
|The Winter Palace||1978-11-01||Collected Poems 1988|-
|Within the dream you said...||1944-10-12||The North Ship|-
|Wires||1950-11-04||The Less Deceived|-
|A Writer||1941-05-08||Collected Poems 2003|-
|-class="sortbottom"
|}

Footnotes

 "Dry-point" written as second part of "Two Portraits about Sex"
 "Oils" written as first part of "Two Portraits about Sex"
 "Waiting for breakfast while she brushed her hair..." only published in the 1966 Faber and Faber reissue
 "We met at the end of the party..." only published in issue 14 of The Larkin Society's journal About Larkin''

References

 
Lists of poems